Hypsicera is a genus of parasitoid wasps belonging to the family Ichneumonidae.

The genus has cosmopolitan distribution.

Species:
 Hypsicera affinis Chiu, 1962
 Hypsicera amica (Seyrig, 1934)

References

Ichneumonidae
Ichneumonidae genera